Andre Pierre Collins (born May 4, 1968) is a former American football  outside linebacker who played ten seasons in the National Football League. He started in Super Bowl XXVI for the Washington Redskins.  Collins currently serves as Director of Retired Players for the National Football League Players Association, where he works to ensure retirees make successful post-football transitions.

A standout inside linebacker at Penn State, Collins was named a 1989 All-American and a Butkus Award finalist.  He attended Cinnaminson High School in Cinnaminson Township, New Jersey. Collins was in the first group of inductees to the Cinnaminson High School Athletics Hall of Fame. 

Collins earned a Bachelor of Science in Health Policy and Administration from Penn State in 1991.

References

External links
"Andre Collins, Transition Player", NFL Players Association website, July 16, 2004.

1968 births
Living people
American football linebackers
Chicago Bears players
Cincinnati Bengals players
Cinnaminson High School alumni
Detroit Lions players
Penn State Nittany Lions football players
People from Cinnaminson Township, New Jersey
People from Riverside Township, New Jersey
Sportspeople from Burlington County, New Jersey
Washington Redskins players
Gaziantep Basketbol players